Ayiroor Sadasivan (1939 - 9 April 2015) was an Indian playback singer who worked mainly in Malayalam cinema.

Early life
Ayiroor Sadasivan was born in Kerala and learned music from an early age.

Career

Death
Sadasivan died in a car accident on 9 April 2015 at the age of 78.

Awards
 2004: Kerala Sangeetha Nataka Akademi Award (Light Music)

References

Citations

1939 births
2015 deaths
Malayalam playback singers
Recipients of the Kerala Sangeetha Nataka Akademi Award